David Hale (born 22 May 1984) is an Australian rules football coach and former player who is currently serving as an assistant coach with the Hawthorn Football Club in the Australian Football League. As a player, he played with the North Melbourne Football Club and Hawthorn Football Club in the Australian Football League.

Early life
Hale was born in Hobart, Tasmania but moved to the Gold Coast, Queensland with his parents prior to his first birthday. He grew up in the Coolangatta area of the Gold Coast and attended Marymount College during his schooling years. In 2000, he began playing with the Coolangatta Tweed Heads Australian Football Club in Division 2 of the state league where he was selected in the AIS/AFL Academy squad . In 2001, he switched to Broadbeach and represented Queensland at the under 18 national championships.

AFL career
Hale was recruited from the Broadbeach Football Club. He represented the Queensland Scorpions at U16 and U18 state championship levels before being taken at pick 7 in the 2001 AFL Draft by the Kangaroos Football Club.

Hale spent the 2002 season playing for the Murray Kangaroos in the VFL before making his AFL debut for North Melbourne in Round 5, 2003.

In 2008 Hale lead the goalkicking for North Melbourne with 37 goals, including a career-best 8 goals against Geelong in Round 21; a performance that earned him 3 votes in the Brownlow Medal. Hale then seemed to fall out of favour with the coaching staff playing only 16 games in 2009 and 12 in 2010.

On 8 October 2010, David Hale was traded to Hawthorn in exchange for a 1st round draft pick.

His first season at the Hawks Hale played a predominantly forward role, providing a tall marking target, then he would provide relief to Max Bailey in the ruck. In 2012 with Bailey injured, Hale took the number one ruck mantle, rotating duties with forward partner, Jarryd Roughead. Hale enjoyed more time on the ball and used his mobility to have an impact around the ground.
Bailey returned in 2013 so Hale again was 2nd mantle in rucking until Bailey would get subbed off and then he took the lead rucking spot.

Hale played in all three of Hawthorn's victorious Grand Finals from 2013 to 2015. Hale was substituted off for Matt Suckling late in the 3rd quarter of the 2015 AFL Grand Final; with abolition of the substitute rule at the end of the 2015 AFL season, this meant that Hale became the last player to be substituted out of the game. He announced his retirement on 6 October 2015.

Coaching

Fremantle Football Club
On 23 October 2015, it was announced that he had joined Fremantle Football Club as an assistant coach under senior coach Ross Lyon alongside former premiership teammate Brent Guerra for the 2016 season.
Hale was not retained as Fremantle Football Club senior coach at the end of the 2019 season, with the position instead going to Justin Longmuir, but Hale however remained at Fremantle Football Club as an assistant coach. At the end of the 2021 season, Hale would depart Fremantle Football Club to return to Hawthorn as an assistant.

Hawthorn Football Club
At the end of the 2021 season, Hale returned to Hawthorn Football Club as an assistant coach under senior coach Sam Mitchell.

Statistics

|- style=background:#EAEAEA
| 2003 ||  || 31
| 3 || 0 || 0 || 5 || 3 || 8 || 4 || 1 || 8 || 0.0 || 0.0 || 1.7 || 1.0 || 2.7 || 1.3 || 0.3 || 2.7 || 0
|-
| 2004 ||  || 31
| 11 || 4 || 2 || 47 || 27 || 74 || 37 || 10 || 62 || 0.4 || 0.2 || 4.3 || 2.5 || 6.7 || 3.4 || 0.9 || 5.6 || 0
|- style=background:#EAEAEA
| 2005 ||  || 31
| 23 || 14 || 2 || 132 || 76 || 208 || 86 || 46 || 224 || 0.6 || 0.1 || 5.7 || 3.3 || 9.0 || 3.7 || 2.0 || 9.7 || 0
|-
| 2006 ||  || 31
| 22 || 11 || 12 || 166 || 84 || 250 || 120 || 42 || 243 || 0.5 || 0.5 || 7.5 || 3.8 || 11.4 || 5.5 || 1.9 || 11.0 || 0
|- style=background:#EAEAEA
| 2007 ||  || 31
| 20 || 14 || 11 || 122 || 99 || 221 || 88 || 39 || 166 || 0.7 || 0.6 || 6.1 || 5.0 || 11.1 || 4.4 || 2.0 || 8.3 || 0
|-
| 2008 ||  || 31
| 22 || 37 || 19 || 156 || 94 || 250 || 130 || 38 || 187 || 1.7 || 0.9 || 7.1 || 4.3 || 11.4 || 5.9 || 1.7 || 8.5 || 8
|- style=background:#EAEAEA
| 2009 ||  || 31
| 16 || 22 || 13 || 94 || 45 || 139 || 79 || 21 || 54 || 1.4 || 0.8 || 5.9 || 2.8 || 8.7 || 4.9 || 1.3 || 3.4 || 4
|-
| 2010 ||  || 31
| 12 || 17 || 8 || 58 || 34 || 92 || 34 || 17 || 38 || 1.4 || 0.7 || 4.8 || 2.8 || 7.7 || 2.8 || 1.4 || 3.2 || 0
|- style=background:#EAEAEA
| 2011 ||  || 20
| 20 || 19 || 15 || 115 || 125 || 240 || 98 || 41 || 273 || 1.0 || 0.8 || 5.8 || 6.3 || 12.0 || 4.9 || 2.1 || 13.7 || 1
|-
| 2012 ||  || 20
| 24 || 24 || 18 || 139 || 192 || 331 || 94 || 54 || 547 || 1.0 || 0.8 || 5.8 || 8.0 || 13.8 || 3.9 || 2.3 || 22.8 || 3
|- style=background:#EAEAEA
| bgcolor=F0E68C | 2013# ||  || 20
| 24 || 20 || 26 || 139 || 174 || 313 || 98 || 60 || 405 || 0.8 || 1.1 || 5.8 || 7.3 || 13.0 || 4.1 || 2.5 || 16.9 || 0
|-
| bgcolor=F0E68C | 2014# ||  || 20
| 22 || 22 || 11 || 101 || 123 || 224 || 77 || 55 || 360 || 1.0 || 0.5 || 4.6 || 5.6 || 10.2 || 3.5 || 2.5 || 16.4 || 0
|- style=background:#EAEAEA
| bgcolor=F0E68C | 2015# ||  || 20
| 18 || 13 || 5 || 66 || 97 || 163 || 41 || 43 || 285 || 0.7 || 0.3 || 3.7 || 5.4 || 9.1 || 2.3 || 2.4 || 15.8 || 0
|- class="sortbottom"
! colspan=3| Career
! 237 !! 217 !! 142 !! 1340 !! 1173 !! 2513 !! 986 !! 467 !! 2852 !! 0.9 !! 0.6 !! 5.7 !! 4.9 !! 10.6 !! 4.2 !! 2.0 !! 12.0 !! 16
|}

Honours and achievements
Team
 3× AFL premiership player: 2013, 2014, 2015
 2× Minor premiership: 2012, 2013
 Minor premiership: 2015

Individual
 North Melbourne Leading Goalkicker: 2008
 Under 18 All-Australian team: 2001

References

External links

North Melbourne Football Club players
Hawthorn Football Club players
Hawthorn Football Club Premiership players
Broadbeach Australian Football Club players
1984 births
Living people
Sportspeople from the Gold Coast, Queensland
Australian rules footballers from Queensland
Australian people of Dutch descent
Box Hill Football Club players
Fremantle Football Club coaches
Three-time VFL/AFL Premiership players